Lafesta may refer to:

Hyundai Lafesta, name of a mid-size sedan produced and sold by Beijing Hyundai in China
Nissan Lafesta, name of a compact MPV built by Nissan for the Asian market
Lafesta (radio station), the first Lithuanian Internet radio station